Sophia Hernández (born 12 January 1997) is a Guatemalan modern pentathlete.

She participated at the 2018 World Modern Pentathlon Championships, winning a medal.

References

External links

Living people
1997 births
Guatemalan female modern pentathletes
World Modern Pentathlon Championships medalists
Central American and Caribbean Games silver medalists for Guatemala
Competitors at the 2018 Central American and Caribbean Games
Central American and Caribbean Games medalists in modern pentathlon
Modern pentathletes at the 2015 Pan American Games